Alvord Lake may refer to:

 Alvord Lake (Arizona)
 Alvord Lake (Montana)
 Alvord Lake (Oregon)
 Alvord Lake, an artificial lake at the east end of Golden Gate Park, San Francisco, US
 Alvord Lake Bridge